Efraim "Effi" Birnbaum (אפרים "אפי" בירנבאום; born 11 June 1954), is an Israeli professional basketball coach.

Coaching career
He was the Israeli Super League's Coach of the Year, in 2005. Birnbaum was the head coach of Maccabi Tel Aviv, for the beginning of the 2008-09 season, until he was terminated on November 24, 2008. He was the Head Coach of Maccabi Rishon Lezion from 2011-2012. He was the Head Coach of Bnei Herzelia from 2013-2014.

Clubs coached

References

1954 births
Living people
Hapoel Jerusalem B.C. coaches
Israeli Jews
Israeli basketball coaches
Maccabi Tel Aviv B.C. coaches